Khadija Oussat is a Moroccan former footballer who played as a goalkeeper. She has been a member of the Morocco women's national team.

Club career
Oussat has played for CA Khénifra in Morocco.

International career
Oussat capped for Morocco at senior level on 8 March 2008 in a 0–6 friendly home lost to France.

See also
 List of Morocco women's international footballers

References

External links

Living people
Moroccan women's footballers
Women's association football goalkeepers
Morocco women's international footballers
Emirati women's footballers
United Arab Emirates women's international footballers
Dual internationalists (women's football)
Year of birth missing (living people)